Don't Explain is the tenth solo studio album by English singer Robert Palmer, released in 1990. During the course of its 18 tracks, Palmer displays rock, R&B, jazz and Bahamian influences. Several classic songs are covered, as well. The album peaked at number 9 in the UK and number 88 in the US.

In the UK the album was certified Gold by the BPI in November 1990.

Track listing
"Your Mother Should Have Told You" (Robert Palmer, Guy Pratt) - 3:41
"Light-Years" (Divinyls, Robert Palmer) - 4:27
"You Can't Get Enough of a Good Thing" (Robert Palmer) - 4:08
"Dreams to Remember" (Otis Redding, Zelda Reading, Joe Rock) - 4:25
"You're Amazing" (Stephen Fellows, Alan Mansfield, Robert Palmer, Guy Pratt, Steve Stevens) - 3:49
"Mess Around" (Stephen Fellows, Robert Palmer) - 4:50
"Happiness" (Robert Palmer) - 2:52
"History" (Robert Palmer) - 4:32
"I'll Be Your Baby Tonight"; with UB40 (Bob Dylan) - 3:26
"Housework" (Stephen Fellows, Robert Palmer) - 3:12
"Mercy Mercy Me" (Marvin Gaye) / "I Want You" (Arthur "T-Boy" Ross, Leon Ware) - 5:59
"Don't Explain" (Arthur Herzog, Jr., Billie Holiday) - 2:28
"Aeroplane" (Robert Palmer) - 3:04
"People Will Say We're in Love" (Richard Rodgers, Oscar Hammerstein) - 2:20
"Not a Word" (Robert Palmer, Guy Pratt, Colin Vearncombe) - 4:18
"Top 40" (Mose Allison) - 2:40
"You're So Desirable" (Ray Noble) - 2:24
"You're My Thrill" (Sidney Clare, Jay Gorney) - 3:58
 N.B.  The liner notes for the 1st US pressing (EMI/Capitol – CDP-7-93935-2) attribute the final song to Ned Washington & Burton Lane.  While they co-wrote a song by that name, the one on Palmer's album is the Clare & Gorney composition made popular by Billie Holiday.

Personnel 
 Robert Palmer – lead and backing vocals, guitar, drums
 Brent Bourgeois – keyboards, backing vocals (2, 3)
 Alan Mansfield – keyboards, drums
 William Bryant – acoustic piano, bass
 Dennis Budimir – guitar
 Alan Darby – guitar
 Eddie Martinez – guitar
 Saverio Porciello – guitar
 Steve Stevens – guitar
 Sneaky Pete Kleinow – pedal steel guitar
 Frank Blair – bass
 Guy Pratt – bass
 Dony Wynn – drums, percussion
 Cyro Baptista – percussion
 Pino Pischetola – percussion
 Claudio Pascoli – saxophones
 Chuck Findley – flugelhorn, trumpet
 Demo Morselli – trumpet
 Luka Belak – violin
 Clare Fischer – clarinet, string and horn arrangements, conductor
 Gerald Vinci – concertmaster
 B.J. Nelson – backing vocals (2, 3, 4)
 Pamela Starks – backing vocals (9)
 UB40 – backing vocals (9)

Production 
 Robert Palmer – producer (1–6, 9, 10, 17), co-producer (7, 8, 11, 13)
 Teo Macero – producer (7, 8, 11–16, 18)
 David Harper – executive producer
 Richard Cobble – production coordination
 Arne Frager – engineer
 Pino Pischetola – engineer
 Mike Fraser – mixing (1, 5)
 Eric "ET" Thorngren – mixing (2, 3, 4, 6–18)
 Henry Marquez – art direction, design 
 Timothy Greenfield-Sanders – photography 
 David King – stylist

Chart performance

Weekly charts

Year-end charts

Certifications

References

Robert Palmer (singer) albums
1990 albums
Albums produced by Robert Palmer (singer)
Albums produced by Teo Macero
EMI Records albums